Austin Sarat (born November 2, 1947) is an American political scientist who is William Nelson Cromwell Professor of Jurisprudence and Political Science at Amherst College in Amherst, Massachusetts. He is also a Five College Fortieth Anniversary Professor. He has written, co-written, or edited more than fifty books in the fields of law and political science. Professor Sarat received a B.A. from Providence College in 1969, and both an M.A. and Ph.D from the University of Wisconsin-Madison in 1970 and 1973, respectively. He also received a J.D. from Yale Law School in 1988.

Sarat's primary research interest is the use of the death penalty, which he refers to as "state killing." He believes that the death penalty, due to the extreme nature of its punishment, provides a unique opportunity to examine American values and beliefs and how they are manifested in the American legal system. His most recent book, Gruesome Spectacles: Botched Executions and America's Death Penalty, tells the extended tale of inhumane lethal punishment in the United States. His earlier book, Mercy On Trial: What it Means To Stop an Execution, investigated the use of executive clemency, particularly Illinois Governor George Ryan's decision to commute all impending death sentences in the Illinois state penitentiary system.
Due to his extensive knowledge on this subject, he was widely consulted by the popular media during the coverage of the Stanley Williams execution in 2005. His research more broadly studies the intersection of law and culture and the ways in which law may be said to be socially organized.

Sarat's seminar, "Murder", has been profiled in The New York Times. He also teaches another popular course at Amherst called "The Social Organization of Law."

Sarat has received the Ronald Pipkin Service Award, awarded annually to a Law and Society Association member who has demonstrated sustained and extraordinary service to the Association, 2014. He also has received the Lasting Contribution Award, awarded by the American Political Science Association’s Section on Law and Courts “for a book or journal article, 10 years or older, that has made a lasting impression on the field of law and courts.” Recognizing "The Emergence of Transformation of Disputes: Naming, Blaming, Claiming," 2011. Sarat also in an Honorary Doctor of Laws at Providence College.

Publications
Lethal Injection and the False Promise of Humane Execution, with Mattea Denney, Nicolas Graber-Mitchell, Greene Ko, Lauren Pelosi, and Rose Mroczka. Stanford University Press, 2022.
Gruesome Spectacles: Botched Executions and America's Death Penalty: Stanford University Press, 2014 
Re-imagining To Kill a Mockingbird: Family, Community, and the Possibility of Equal Justice under Law. University of Massachusetts Press, 2013
Legal Responses to Religious Practices in the United States: Accommodation and its Limits. Cambridge University Press, 2012
The Secrets of Law, with Lawrence Douglas and Martha Umphrey. Stanford University Press, 2012
Imaging New Legalities: Privacy and its Possibilities in the Twenty First Century, with Lawrence Douglas and Martha Umphrey. Stanford University Press, 2011
Life Without Parole: America’s New Death Penalty?, with Charles Ogletree NYU Press, 2012
Dissenting Voices in American Society: the Role of Judges, Lawyers, and Citizens. Cambridge University Press, 2012
Merciful Judgments and Contemporary Society: Legal Problems, Legal Possibilities. Cambridge University Press, 2011
Transitions: Legal Changes, Legal Meanings University of Alabama Press, 2011
Who Deserves to Die, with Karl Shoemaker University of Massachusetts Press, 2011
Imagining Legality: When Law Meets Popular Culture. University of Alabama Press, 2011
Options for Teaching: Teaching Literature and Law, Cathrine Frank and Matthew Anderson. Modern Language Association, 2011
Law as Punishment/Law as Regulation with Lawrence Douglas and Martha Umphrey. Stanford University Press, 2011
Is the Death Penalty Dying?: European and American Perspectives Cambridge University Press, 2011
Subjects of Responsibility with Andrew Parker and Martha Umphrey Fordham University Press, 2011
Law Without Nations. with Lawrence Douglas and Martha Umphrey. Stanford University Press, 2010
Performances of Violence, with Carleen Basler and Tom Dumm University of Massachusetts Press, 2010
When Government Breaks the Law: Prosecuting the Bush Administration, with Nasser Hussain. New York University Press, 2010
Law and the Stranger with Lawrence Douglas and Martha Umphrey Stanford University Press, 2010
Speech and Silence in American Law. Cambridge University Press, 2010
Sovereignty, Emergency, Legality. Cambridge University Press, 2010
Law and the Humanities: An Introduction, with Cathrine Frank and Matthew Anderson. Cambridge University Press, 2009
The Road to Abolition, with Charles Ogletree. New York University Press.
Crisis and Catastrophe: Political, Legal, and Humanitarian Responses, with Javier Lezaun. University of Massachusetts Press, 2009
When Law Fails: Making Sense of Miscarriages of Justice. ed. with Charles Ogletree. New York University Press, 2009
The Cultural Lives of Cause Lawyers, ed. with Stuart Scheingold. Stanford University Press, 2008
Forgiveness, Mercy, Clemency, ed. with Nasser Hussain. Stanford University Press, 2007
Trauma and Memory - Reading, Healing and Making Law, ed., with Michal Alberstein and Nadav Davidovitch. Stanford University Press, 2007
Cause Lawyers and Social Movements, ed. with Stuart Scheingold. Stanford University Press, 2006
From Lynch Mobs to the Killing State: Race and The Death Penalty in America, ed. with Charles Ogletree. New York University Press, 2006
The Cultural Life of Capital Punishment: Comparative Perspectives, ed. with Christian Boulanger. Stanford University Press, 2005
Mercy on Trial: What It Means To Stop an Execution. Princeton University Press, 2005
The Limits of Law, ed. with Lawrence Douglas and Martha Umphrey. Stanford University Press, 2005
Law on the Screen, ed. with Lawrence Douglas and Martha Umphrey. Stanford University Press, 2005
Dissent in Dangerous Times ed., University of Michigan Press, 2005
Something to Believe In: Politics, Professionalism, and Cause Lawyers, with Stuart Scheingold. Stanford University Press, 2004
Law in the Liberal Arts, ed.,Cornell University Press, 2004
Cultural Analysis, Cultural Studies and the Law: Moving Beyond Legal Realism, ed. with Jonathan Simon. Duke University Press, 2003
Looking Back At Law’s Century: Time, Memory, and Change, ed. with Bryant Garth and Robert Kagan. Cornell University Press, 2002
When the State Kills: Capital Punishment and the American Condition. Princeton University Press, 2001
Law, Violence, and the Possibility of Justice, ed.,Princeton University Press, 2001
Pain, Death, and the Law, ed., University of Michigan Press 2001

References

External links
 Profile at Amherst College

Amherst College faculty
Living people
1947 births
University of Wisconsin–Madison alumni
American political scientists
Yale Law School alumni
Providence College alumni